D49 road may refer to:
 D49 road (Croatia)
 D49 motorway (Czech Republic)